Matt Hindle (born May 23, 1974 in Calgary, Alberta) is a Canadian bobsledder who competed in the 1990s. Hindle won a bronze medal in the four-man event at the 1999 FIBT World Championships in Cortina d'Ampezzo.

Competing in two Winter Olympics, He finished 11th in the four-man event at Nagano in 1998.

Since 2002, Hindle has been development coach for Bobsleigh Canada Skeleton.

References
Bobsleigh four-man world championship medalists since 1930
Canadiansport.com information on the 2002-3 bobsleigh and skeleton team featuring Hindle as a coach
CBC.ca story that includes Hindle

1974 births
Bobsledders at the 1998 Winter Olympics
Bobsledders at the 2002 Winter Olympics
Canadian male bobsledders
Living people
Olympic bobsledders of Canada
Sportspeople from Calgary